is a Japanese female badminton player.

Achievements

BWF World Junior Championships 
Girls' singles

Asian Junior Championships 
Girls' singles

BWF International Challenge/Series 
Women's singles

  BWF International Challenge tournament
  BWF International Series tournament
  BWF Future Series tournament

References

External links 
 

Living people
1998 births
Sportspeople from Saitama Prefecture
Japanese female badminton players
21st-century Japanese women